Lourembam Bino Devi (born 1 March 1944) is a practitioner and a popularizer of the appliqué art of Manipur called Leeba in the Meitei language. The Leeba art is used in creating Monmai which is a decorative circular appliqué art piece used in covering both ends of the traditional Manipuri  bolster pillow. In the olden days, Leeba was practiced at "Phiribi Loishang", which is a house for maintaining clothes worn by the deities and royals. The apparels used by the royals, including shoes, were mostly designed using the Leeba technique. Bino Devi has devoted her life to practice this art form and to revive it by trying to transmit her skills to younger generation of interested women. She has been providing this training in collaboration with the Heritage Foundation of Mankind, a Non-Governmantal Organization located in Imphal. She has also conducted several workshops at Imphal and at various other places in India.

Early life

Lourembam Bino Devi was born on 1 March 1944 at Singjamei Mathak Thokchom Leikai, Imphal West, Manipur to Thokchom Mani Singh and Thokchom ongbi Ibemhal Devi. She completed class IX from Tamphasana Girls' High School, Imphal. At the age of 17, just after her marriage, she started work in Phiribi/Leeba (traditional applique art of Manipur). She received training in this art under  Lourembam Ibetombi Devi, her own mother-in-law, who was the first National Awardee in Handicraft in 1969. Besides various handicrafts, she has designed several traditional items that are mandatory for a Manipuri marriage ceremony like Monmai, Ningkham Samjin, Luhon Phijil, Harao Phijil, Khudol Khongup and Kangkhal Asuba. For her work, the Ministry of Textiles, Government of India awarded her a stipend of Rs.15,000 per year starting from 1996 to February 2014 and from March 2014 it has been increased to Rs.24,000 per year. She has been described as an expert appliqué artisan in the book "Khutheibalaktagi" written by Sanasam Biren Singh (2013).

Recognition: Padma Shri

In the year 2022, Govt of India conferred the Padma Shri award, the third highest award in the Padma series of awards, on Lourembam Bino Devi  for her distinguished service in the field of art. The award is in recognition of her service as a "Veteran Appliqué Textile Artist preserving the Leeba textile art of Manipur for over five decades.".

Other recognitions/achievements

The recognitions earned by Lourembam Bino Devi include:

State Award for Master Craftsmen by Commerce and Industries Department, Government of Manipur (1996)
First Prize Winner in the 46th All India Handicrafts Week Celebration 2000-2001 organized by Government of Manipur
Restored the Flag of Maharaja Chandrakirti at Manipur Kulachandra Singh, Khuman Lampak, 2012
Repaired two pairs of rare velvet shoes used by Maharaja Kulachandra Singh, (1890–91) for displaying at the Kangla Museum, Imphal, 2013
Silpa Bhusan Award by Manipuri Sahitya Parishad, 2015
Women Achievers Award by Mahila Morcha, BJP Manipur Pradesh (2015)

See also
Padma Shri Award recipients in the year 2022

References

Additional reading
Richana Khumanthem in conversation with L. Bino Devi, Imphal, August 2016: 
For an understanding of the Meetei identity expressed through the text and texture of clothing in ritual context: 

Textile arts of India
Indian textile artists
Recipients of the Padma Shri in arts
1944 births
Living people